Salamandra (English: Salamander) is the eighth studio album Spanish musician and actor, Miguel Bosé, and his first with Warner Bros. Records (Warner Music Latina in the U.S.). It was released in May 1986 in Spain, but not until 1989 in the U.S.P

Track listing

1986 albums
Miguel Bosé albums
Warner Music Latina albums